He Cooked His Goose is a 1952 short subject directed by Jules White starring American slapstick comedy team The Three Stooges (Moe Howard, Larry Fine and Shemp Howard). It is the 140th entry in the series released by Columbia Pictures starring the comedians, who released 190 shorts for the studio between 1934 and 1959.

Plot
Larry is a womanizer who is having an affair with Moe's wife, Belle (Mary Ainslee) while making eyes at Shemp's fiancée, Millie (Angela Stevens), as well. Moe, however, tracks down the conniving Larry at his pet shop, and gives him the works. Larry is able to think fast and convinces Moe he is innocent, which calms him down. Realizing he needs to cover his tracks, Larry looks for a "fall guy" in the form of Shemp. Larry then gets Shemp a job as an underwear salesman and the first place he goes is Moe's home.

While Shemp is modeling his ware for Belle, Larry calls both Millie and Moe and lies to them about Shemp's advances on Moe's wife. Both of them go storming over to Moe's, with Moe carrying a loaded gun. Looking to avoid being killed, Shemp flees up the chimney. After he fools Moe with a Santa Claus disguise, Shemp makes a quick getaway. Shemp then spies Larry coming. Now aware that Larry set him up, Shemp knocks Larry out and dresses him in the Santa outfit and sends him to Moe, Millie, and Moe's wife. Moe unmasks Larry to the surprise of them all that he tricked Moe and chases him out of the apartment. Moe shoots Larry in the buttocks times before accidentally shooting himself in the foot while celebrating.

Cast

Credited
 Moe Howard as Moe
 Larry Fine as Larry
 Shemp Howard as Joe
 Mary Ainslee as Belle
 Angela Stevens as Millie 
 Theila Darin as Miss Lapdale

Uncredited
 Johnny Kascier as Waiter/Moe's stand-in
 Charles Cross as Larry's stand-in
 Harold Breen as Shemp's stand-in

Production notes
He Cooked His Goose was reworked in 1959 as Triple Crossed, using ample stock footage from the original. It is one of only three films in which Larry Fine is the main character. The other two where he takes the lead role are Woman Haters and Three Loan Wolves.

He Cooked His Goose was filmed on January 7–9, 1952 when Christmas trees were available, but not released until July. When Belle answers the door for Shemp, the Christmas tree she was hanging earlier with Moe is missing.

Former stooge Curly Howard died on January 18, 1952, a whole week following filming.

This was the final film featuring new footage of long-time Stooge character actress Mary Ainslee, following of her retired acting career.

Over the course of their 24 years at Columbia Pictures, the Stooges would occasionally be cast as separate characters. This course of action always worked against the team; author Jon Solomon concluded "when the writing divides them, they lose their comic dynamic". In addition to this split occurring in He Cooked His Goose (and its remake Triple Crossed), the trio also played separate characters in Rockin' in the Rockies, Cuckoo on a Choo Choo, Gypped in the Penthouse, Flying Saucer Daffy and Sweet and Hot.

References

External links
 
 
He Cooked His Goose at threestooges.net

1952 films
1952 comedy films
The Three Stooges films
1950s Christmas films
1950s Christmas comedy films
American black-and-white films
Films directed by Jules White
Columbia Pictures short films
American comedy short films
1950s English-language films
1950s American films